The 2022 Inter-Provincial Cup is the tenth edition of the Inter-Provincial Cup, a List A cricket competition that is taking place in Ireland during 2022. It is the sixth edition of the competition to be played with List A status. On 4 March 2022, Cricket Ireland confirmed the fixtures for the tournament.

Leinster Lightning were the defending champions, having won the tournament for an eighth time in 2021. In the opening match, Leinster Lightning began their title defence with a seven wicket win against North West Warriors, with George Dockrell taking a five-wicket haul. In their next match, Leinster Lightning made 304/6 against Munster Reds, but lost by five wickets after Peter Moor scored 152 runs, the highest individual score in the Inter-Provincial Cup. Munster Reds also made the highest successful run chase in an Inter-Provincial Cup match.

Munster Reds won their first senior title following the abandonment of the final slate of matches.

Points table

Fixtures

References

External links
 Series home at ESPNcricinfo

Interprovincial Cup
Inter-Provincial Cup seasons